The 1960 PGA Tour season was played from January 8 to December 11. The season consisted of 44 official money events. Arnold Palmer won the most tournaments, eight, and there were two first-time winners. Palmer was the leading money winner with earnings of $75,263. Palmer was voted the PGA Player of the Year and Billy Casper won the Vardon Trophy for the lowest scoring average.

Schedule
The following table lists official events during the 1960 season.

Unofficial events
The following events were sanctioned by the PGA Tour, but did not carry official money, nor were wins official.

Awards

Notes

References

External links
PGA Tour official site

PGA Tour seasons
PGA Tour